The Office for Standards in Education, Children's Services and Skills (Ofsted) is a non-ministerial department of His Majesty's government, reporting to Parliament. Ofsted is responsible for inspecting a range of educational institutions, including state schools and some independent schools, in England. It also inspects childcare, adoption and fostering agencies and initial teacher training, and regulates a range of early years and children's social care services.

The chief inspector ("HMCI") is appointed by an Order in Council and thus becomes an office holder under the Crown. Amanda Spielman has been HMCI ;  the chair of Ofsted has been Christine Ryan: her predecessors include Julius Weinberg and David Hoare.

Ofsted is also the colloquial name used in the education sector to refer to an Ofsted inspection, or an Ofsted inspection report. An Ofsted section 5 inspection is called a 'full report' and administered under section 5 of the 2005 Education Act, while a monitoring visit is conducted under the authority given by section 8 of the 2005 Education Act and can also be called an Ofsted section 8 inspection.

History
In 1833, Parliament agreed an annual grant to the National Society for Promoting Religious Education and the British and Foreign School Society, which respectively provided Church of England and non-denominational elementary schools for poor children. In 1837, two inspectors of schools, Seymour Tremenheere and the Reverend John Allen, were appointed to monitor the effectiveness of the grant. Dr James Kay-Shuttleworth, then Secretary of the Privy Council's Education Committee, ensured that the inspectors were appointed by Order in Council to guard their independence.

The grant and inspection system was extended in 1847 to Roman Catholic elementary schools established by the Catholic Poor School Committee. Inspectors were organised on denominational lines, with the churches having a say in the choice of inspectors, until 1876, when the inspectorate was reorganised by area.

After the Education Act 1902, inspections were expanded to state-funded secondary schools along similar lines. Over time more inspections were carried out by inspectors based in local education authorities, with His Majesty's Inspectorate (HMI) focusing on reporting to the Secretary of State on education across the country.

The government of John Major, concerned about variable local inspection regimes, decided to introduce a national scheme of inspections though a reconstituted HMI, which became known as the Office for Standards in Education (Ofsted). Under the Education (Schools) Act 1992, HMI would supervise the inspection of each state-funded school in the country, and would publish its reports for the benefit of schools, parents, and government instead of reporting to the Secretary of State.

In September 2001, HM Chief Inspector of Schools in England became responsible for registration and inspection of day care and childminding in England, and the position was renamed HM Chief Inspector of Education, Children's Services and Skills. Previously this was done by 150 local authorities, based on their implementation by 1992 of the Daycare Standards provisions of the 1989 Children Act.

Schedule 11 of the Education and Inspections Act 2006 changed the way in which Ofsted works without significantly changing the provision. Since 2006 the structure of Ofsted has derived elements from business models, with a Chair, an executive board, regional officers, and a formal annual report to Parliament in the light of concerns about schools, and local authority children's services. In April 2007, the former Office for Standards in Education merged with the Adult Learning Inspectorate (ALI) to provide an inspection service that includes all post-16 government funded education (but not Higher Education Institutes and Universities which are inspected by the Quality Assurance Agency). At the same time it took on responsibility for the registration and inspection of social care services for children, and the welfare inspection of independent and maintained boarding schools from the Commission for Social Care Inspection (CSCI).

Current state
The services Ofsted inspects or regulates include local services, childminding, child day care, children's centres, children's social care, CAFCASS, state schools, private schools and teacher training providers, colleges, and learning and skills providers in England. It also monitors the work of the Independent Schools Inspectorate. HMI are empowered and required to provide independent advice to the United Kingdom government and parliament on matters of policy and to publish an annual report to parliament on the quality of educational provision in England. Ofsted distributes its functions amongst its offices in London, Manchester, Nottingham, Birmingham, Cambridge, York, Darlington and Bristol.

Ofsted covers only England; the Education and Training Inspectorate in Northern Ireland, Education Scotland (previously HM Inspectorate of Education) in Scotland, and Estyn in Wales perform similar functions within their education systems.

A new Education Inspection Framework (EIF) introduced from September 2019 sets out how Ofsted undertakes inspections under section 5 of the Education Act 2005 (as amended), section 109 of the Education and Skills Act 2008, the Education and Inspections Act 2006 and the Childcare Act 2006.

Inspectors

The current Chief Inspector is Amanda Spielman, who was appointed in January 2017 replacing Sir Michael Wilshaw.

Ofsted directly employs His Majesty's Inspectors (HMI), who are appointed by the King in Council. , there were 443 HMIs, of whom 82 were engaged in management, 245 in the inspection of schools, and the rest in the inspection of other areas for which Ofsted in responsible. All HMIs inspecting schools have teaching experience.

When Ofsted was created the original plan was that inspectors would not be drawn from education. the plan was to give parents an independent review of a school untainted by the education establishment. This plan was quickly replaced by a system that existed until 2005. This system was based on schools being inspected by teams containing three types of inspector. Each team was led by a 'registered' inspector. They were accompanied by a number of 'team' inspectors, the number of which depended on the size of the school. Each team also contained 'lay' inspector recruited from outside the world of education. In September 2005 the distinction between registered, team and lay inspectors was removed and all contracted inspectors (as opposed to directly employed HMI) became 'Ofsted inspectors'.

Most school inspections were carried out by additional  Inspectors (AI) employed by external companies known as Regional Inspection Service Providers (RISPs). , there were 1,948 AIs, of whom 1,567 inspect schools. Although Ofsted claims that most of these have teaching experience, in 2012 it was forced to admit that it had done no quality control checks on these inspectors, and that a few of them – including lead inspectors – were not qualified teachers as prior to 2005 they had been 'lay' inspectors. In 2015, the chief inspector (Sir Michael Wilshall) decided that he wanted more direct control over Ofsted inspectors brought responsibility for their training, deployment and quality 'in-house' and abolished the contracts with the RISPs who are no more.  40% of additional inspectors who wanted to continue working for OFSTED were not re-hired after the contractual change. Although OFSTED insisted that this was part of a quality control process and "should not be seen as an admission that its inspections were substandard", serving headteacher and Times Educational Supplement columnist Geoff Barton commented "dispensing with almost 40 per cent of inspectors on the grounds of quality is hardly an endorsement of standards."

An HMI accompanies an Ofsted inspector on a sample of inspections, including 75% of those of secondary schools. Reports produced by RISPs must be checked and signed off by HMI, sometimes with amendments, before publication. New Additional Inspectors must be monitored and signed off by HMI before working independently.

The number of RISPs contracted to conduct school inspections was reduced in 2009 from five to three:
 CfBT Education Trust, covering the North of England
 Serco Education and Children's Services, covering the English Midlands
 Tribal Group, covering the South of England

Following lobbying from the teacher unions and other, all inspections were brought in house in September 2015. , seventy per-cent of the inspectors are now headteachers or school leaders.

School inspections
The Office carries out regular inspections of maintained schools and academies, and some independent schools in England, and publishes online reports of their findings so they can be used to improve the overall quality of education and training.

System before 2005
Before 2005 each school was inspected for a week every six years, with two months' notice to prepare for an inspection. This regime was criticised by teachers and school heads as greatly disruptive of the operation of the school, and by others as enabling schools to present an unrealistic picture of themselves that did not truly reflect the quality of teaching and learning in the school.

2005–2012
In September 2005 a new system of short-notice inspections came into being. Under this system the senior leadership of each school were strongly encouraged to complete a Self Evaluation Form (SEF) on a continual basis, which required them to be aware of strengths and areas for development. Inspections were generally two- or three-day visits every three years, with two days' notice. They focussed on the "central nervous system" of the school – examining how well the school was managed, and what processes were in place to ensure standards improve; the school leadership and management were expected to be aware of everything in the SEF. The SEF served as the main document when planning the inspection, and was crucial in evaluating the school's capacity to improve.

After an inspection of a school, Ofsted published a report on the school on its website. In addition to written comments on a number of areas, schools were assessed on each area and overall on a 4-point scale: 1 (Outstanding), 2 (Good), 3 (Satisfactory) and 4 (Inadequate). Schools rated Outstanding or Good might not be inspected again for five years, while schools judged less favourably were inspected more frequently, and might receive little or no notice of inspection visits.

Figures published in March 2010 showed that revised inspection criteria, which were introduced in September 2009, resulted in a reduction from 19% to 9% in the number of schools judged to be Outstanding, and an increase from 4% to 10% in the number of schools judged to be Inadequate.

2012–2015

Section 5 
A framework for section 5 inspections of academies and maintained schools was introduced from January 2012, and replaced with another new framework in September 2012. Public consultation was undertaken, and Ofsted prepared for the new framework after piloting a series of inspections across the country. Among other changes, the new system relabelled the "Satisfactory" category as "Requires Improvement", with an expectation that schools should not remain at that level.

System after 2015
In 2015 they published a Common Inspection Framework, and four handbooks which gave much of the details of inspections. These are no longer/not statutory documents so can be changed regularly. The four handbooks are:
Maintained schools and academies
Early years
Non-association independent schools
Further education and skills

A new Education Inspection Framework (EIF) introduced from September 2019 sets out how Ofsted undertakes inspections under section 5 of the Education Act 2005 (as amended), section 109 of the Education and Skills Act 2008, the Education and Inspections Act 2006 and the Childcare Act 2006.

A Section 5 is also known as a full inspection; a section 8 is also called a monitoring visit. When the inspectors find serious causes for concern, they may extend the section 8 so it becomes a section 5 with the additional legal powers. Similarly, when using a Section 8 to confirm a Good School's continual status, they may extend the inspection by one day so converting it into a Section 5 in order to grade the school outstanding.

Section 8 
Section 8 of the Education Act 2005 (as amended) gives the Secretary of State the legal authority to request His Majesty's Chief Inspector (HMCI) to enter a school for the purpose of obtaining information. Section 8 Inspections cannot change a schools allocated designation but can trigger a Section 5 Inspection where that might happen.

They are used in three ways:
 to monitor the progress a school rated as level 4 (Inadequate) has made in following the advice they had been given
 to inspect school rated as level 1 (Outstanding) and thus exempt from Section 5 Inspection, when information has been received that caused concern
 to enter a school or groups of schools to gather information for the Secretary of State on current issues that maybe needed for a report.

Format of a 2018 section 5 report
Address and inspection dates 
Overall effectiveness: a grade
Effectiveness of leadership and management: a grade
Quality of teaching, learning and assessment: a grade
Personal development, behaviour and welfare: a grade
Outcomes for pupils: a grade
Early years provision: if present a grade
16 to 19 study programmes: if present a grade
Overall effectiveness at previous inspection: a single grade 
This is followed by :
'Summary of key findings for parents and pupils'
'What does the school need to do to improve further?' 

Inspection judgements form the body of the report. For each heading, eight or more critical paragraphs, at the inspectors discretion, are written that support the grade given.

 A single page giving a formal table of data held on the school on Government Databases.
 A free text description of the school.
 Details of the inspection team, and the scope of the inspection.

Emphasis in 2020
The two principal strands that are being examined are the effectiveness of safeguarding of the students and the impact of governance and management.

Special measures (2009)

A school is placed into special measures if it is judged as 'inadequate' (Grade 4) in one or more areas and if the inspectors have decided it does not have the capacity to improve without additional help. Schools placed into special measures receive intensive support from local authorities, additional funding and resourcing, and frequent reappraisal from Ofsted until the school is no longer deemed to be failing. Furthermore, the senior managers and teaching staff can be dismissed and the governing body may be replaced by an appointed Interim Executive Board (IEB). Schools which are failing but where inspectors consider there is capacity to improve are given a Notice to Improve (NtI).

Home educator inspections
Ofsted, as of April 2015, was issuing new guidance to inspectors which will include the following: 
Home-educated children are not, by definition, all in need of protection and help.
Ofsted does not have a mandate to inspect the quality of home education.
The statutory duty on local authorities (LAs) to identify as far as possible those children not receiving a suitable education does not extend to home-educated children.
The details, and limits, of the guidance in relation to home education

Child care inspections

Child protection
Ofsted also oversees Child Protection by English Local Authorities. In December 2008, Christine Gilbert revealed that Ofsted had been gullible: good ratings could be given, based purely on data submitted directly by local authority providers of care services, that could easily be concealing dangerously flawed practices. This was considered a factor, by The Daily Telegraph, in overlooking alleged inadequacies in Haringey Council's child care provision in the case of Baby P, a child murdered by his parents and their lodger.
MPs criticised Ofsted for issuing a favourable report on Haringey Children's Services three months after the death, and for their policy of destroying all source materials on inspections of children's services after three months, which made it impossible to identify the mistakes made. According to Ofsted, three children died in England and Wales from abuse every week between April 2007 and August 2008. The National Society for the Prevention of Cruelty to Children gives a figure of 1 to 2 per week.

Criticisms
Ofsted was criticised as 'not fit for purpose' in 2007 by the House of Commons Education Select Committee.
The committee also highlighted their concern about "the complex set of objectives and sectors that Ofsted now spans and its capacity to fulfil its core mission". Other criticism came from the Association of Teachers and Lecturers (ATL) which said  "Ofsted is over-reliant on number crunching, using test data which are fundamentally unsound" and added that the organisation was "ripe for overhaul".

Over a period of several years the Select Committee had questioned the Chief Inspector over its treatment of Summerhill School and what it had learnt from the 1999 Court Case and subsequent inspections. In the Court Agreement between DfE and Summerhill School, Independent Schools Tribunal IST/59, inspections would include two advisors from the school and one from the DfE to ensure the fairness of the process. The school had campaigned for all schools to be similarly inspected, ensuring openness and accountability for the process.

In August 2013, 18 of the 24 newly launched Free Schools were graded Good or Outstanding by Ofsted; however, with over 100 state schools being downgraded from an Outstanding classification that year, the consistency of Ofsted grading was once again brought into question, leading to numerous 'How to get a Good Ofsted' guides being created.

A 2014 report by the think tank Policy Exchange indicated that many Ofsted inspectors lack the knowledge required to make fair judgements of lessons and that judgements are so unreliable, "you would be better off flipping a coin".

A 2014 poll of teachers, carried out by Teacher Support Network, revealed that over 90% of teachers felt Ofsted inspections had a neutral or negative impact on students' results. In response to criticisms about the increased workload inspection frameworks caused, Ofsted pledged it would not change its inspection framework during the school year. Wilshaw also dismissed speculation that Ofsted itself was responsible for teachers' heavy workload (in excess of 60 hours per week) describing it as 'a red herring'. However, a 2015 poll by the NUT found that 53% of teachers were planning to leave teaching by 2017, with the extra workload from Ofsted's 'accountability agenda' a key factor in seeking a job with a better work/life balance.

The Ofsted complaints procedure has also been heavily criticised for opacity and a strong bias in favour of the inspectors. Geoff Barton, after writing an article strongly critical of Ofsted's use of raw data rather than inspection reports to determine grades, noted that: the Ofsted complaints procedure too often seems constructed around a deep and dutiful need for self-protection. Thus an inspection system that demands transparency from schools refuses to release its own inspection notes, When challenged, it dares us to resort to a Freedom of Information request and then rejects those same requests because they don't conform to a definition of "public interest".

In 2015, an inspector revealed that inspection judgements can be arbitrarily over-ruled by senior figures, commenting on a case where a school had been downgraded: We couldn't understand this rationale at all. It turned out that Ofsted had made a brief visit to the school some time before the inspection and had come up with some sort of unreported provisional judgement. So all that evidence we had gathered meant nothing and essentially this team of experienced inspectors was not trusted to make a judgement. Barton concluded his article, "the accounts above reveal an inspection system that appears in too many cases to be doing great damage. My sense is that it's time to stop quietly accepting that the way Ofsted is the way Ofsted should be." In response, Wilshaw attacked Barton for being "too quick to perpetuate a 'them against us' view of the schools inspectorate... we fall back on a 'clichéd defence-mechanism' of whingeing about inconsistency", and insisted that Ofsted was becoming "more rigorous and demanding". However, Barton argued the letter lost some of its force and all of its credibility for being published on the day 40% of inspectors were sacked for not being up to the job.

In 2019, Ofsted commissioned a survey on teachers' wellbeing. The Guardian reported that "Teachers said they spent less than half their time in the classroom, with the bulk of their hours spent on marking, planning and administration, including data entry and feedback required by school management to prepare for Ofsted inspections." Teachers worked a 50 to 57 hour week. Geoff Barton, the general secretary of the Association of School and College Leaders, said "Ofsted and the government are the source of much of the stress and anxiety on staff through an extremely high-pressure accountability system."

In popular culture
Hope and Glory, a BBC television drama featuring actor/comedian Lenny Henry, gave an insight into a fictional portrayal of teachers dealing with a school in Special Measures.
OFSTED! The Musical was launched in 2004 at the Edinburgh Festival Fringe. The piece enjoyed a total sell-out run at Venue 45 and won the Writers' Guild Award for Drama 2004 and the List Magazine Award. The musical was later broadcast on Teachers TV as part of their launch night schedule.
Summerhill, a BBC TV drama, depicted the school being threatened with closure due to an inspection and winning a court case in 2000 against the DfE and its actions based on the inspection report.

Senior people

His Majesty's Chief Inspector

His Majesty's Chief Inspector of Education, Children's Services and Skills (sometimes abbreviated to HMCI) is the head of Ofsted. Amanda Spielman was appointed His Majesty's Chief Inspector of Education, Children's Services and Skills on 1 January 2017.

The title of His Majesty's Chief Inspector of Schools (HMCI) was created at the same time as The Office for Standards in Education (Ofsted) itself.  Before Ofsted was set up in 1992, the person heading its forerunner, HM Inspectorate of Schools, was known as the Senior Chief Inspector (SCI) and was also a Deputy Secretary in the Department of Education and Science.

1944–1957: SCI Martin Roseveare, later Sir Martin Roseveare
1965–1967: SCI Cyril English, later Sir Cyril English
1967–1972: SCI W. R. Elliott
1972–1974: SCI Harry W. French
1974–1983: SCI Sheila Browne
1983–1991: SCI Eric Bolton
1991–1992: SCI Terry Melia
1992–1994: HMCI Stewart Sutherland, later Baron Sutherland of Houndwood
1994–2000: Chris Woodhead, later Sir Chris Woodhead
2000–2002: Mike Tomlinson, later Sir Mike Tomlinson
2002–2006: David Bell, later Sir David Bell
January–October 2006: Maurice Smith (acting)
2006–2011: Christine Gilbert
July–December 2011: Miriam Rosen (acting)
January 2012 – December 2016: Sir Michael Wilshaw
January 2017–present: Amanda Spielman

Chair of Ofsted
Since 2006, the structure of Ofsted has included a board headed by a chair. The following have served as Chair of Ofsted:

 2011–2014: Sally Morgan, Baroness Morgan of Huyton
 2014–2016: David Hoare
 2016–2017: James Kempton (interim)
 2017–2020: Julius Weinberg
 2020–present: Christine Ryan

See also
Education in England

References

External links

NASUWT Guidance to teachers: Ofsted inspection of maintained schools and academies, September 2021
ASCL guidance to 2019 EIF changes

Education in England
Educational organisations based in London
Non-ministerial departments of the Government of the United Kingdom
1992 establishments in England
School accreditors
Department for Education
Welfare in England
Social work organizations
Government agencies established in 2002
Government of England
Education regulators
Regulators of England